The JT26C-2SS is a model of heavy haul diesel electric locomotive designed and built by Clyde Engineering in Australia, based on Electro-Motive Division designs.  There were 3 derivative models produced for 3 different government operators in Australia.  These variants are:

New South Wales 81 class locomotive
Australian National BL class
V/Line G Class

These locomotives were developed from the J26C-2SS design used for the New South Wales 422 class locomotive which added a turbocharger, amongst other design improvements.  They are also similar to the Australian National AL class.

Related development
New South Wales 422 class locomotive
Australian National AL class
British Rail Class 59

Diesel-electric locomotives of Australia